The UEFA European Women's Futsal Championship is the main futsal competition of the women's national futsal teams governed by UEFA (the Union of European Football Associations).

The tournament is held every two years, with the first final tournament was held in February 2019 and featured four teams. The second edition, originally to be held in 2021, had been postponed a year to 2022 due to the COVID-19 pandemic.

Spain is the most successful team after winning the three first editions.

Results by edition

Performance by nations

Participation details

See also
 UEFS Futsal Women's Championship
 UEFA Futsal Championship

References

External links

 
Women's international futsal competitions
Futsal Championship
Futsal competitions in Europe
European championships
2018 establishments in Europe
Recurring sporting events established in 2018